The 82nd 2005 Lithuanian Athletics Championships were held in S. Darius and S. Girėnas Stadium, Kaunas on 8–9 July 2005.

Men

Women

References 
Results

External links 
 Lithuanian athletics (old)
 Lithuanian athletics (new)

Lithuanian Athletics Championships
Lithuanian Athletics Championships, 2005
Lithuanian Athletics Championships